Epichoristodes pylora is a species of moth of the family Tortricidae. It is found in the Democratic Republic of Congo.

References

Moths described in 1938
Archipini
Taxa named by Alexey Diakonoff
Endemic fauna of the Democratic Republic of the Congo